Antulio Delgado (born 4 October 1961) is a Guatemalan weightlifter. He competed in the men's lightweight event at the 1984 Summer Olympics.

References

1961 births
Living people
Guatemalan male weightlifters
Olympic weightlifters of Guatemala
Weightlifters at the 1984 Summer Olympics
Place of birth missing (living people)
20th-century Guatemalan people